Brubaker Covered Bridge runs across Sandy Run, to the west-northwest of Gratis Township, Preble County, Ohio. The bridge is of Childs Truss construction.

References

External links

Covered bridges on the National Register of Historic Places in Ohio
Bridges completed in 1887
Buildings and structures in Preble County, Ohio
National Register of Historic Places in Preble County, Ohio
Transportation in Preble County, Ohio
Tourist attractions in Preble County, Ohio
Road bridges on the National Register of Historic Places in Ohio
Wooden bridges in Ohio